Protein-glutamine gamma-glutamyltransferase E is an enzyme that in humans is encoded by the TGM3 gene.

Transglutaminases are enzymes that catalyze the crosslinking of proteins by epsilon-gamma glutamyl lysine isopeptide bonds. While the primary structure of transglutaminases is not conserved, they all have the same amino acid sequence at their active sites and their activity is calcium-dependent. The protein encoded by this gene consists of two polypeptide chains activated from a single precursor protein by proteolysis. The encoded protein is involved the later stages of cell envelope formation in the epidermis and hair follicle.

See also
 Proximal promoter

References

Further reading